Kalithozhi is a 1971 Indian Malayalam film directed and produced by D. M. Pottekkad. The film featured actors Prem Nazir, Sheela, Sathyan and Jayabharathi. The musical score was composed by G. Devarajan and K. Raghavan.

Synopsis 

Amminikutty (Ammini) and Raghavan are depicted as childhood friends who share everything. After they grow up, Raghavan moves to Madras (Chennai) to look for work, but returns home after a few months. Ammini is excited to see him. They meet and realize that they are in love. However, Thamphi also loves Ammini, who doesn't reciprocate Thamphi's feelings, so Thamphi tries to separate Ammini and Raghavan. One day, when Ammini comes back from Sarppakkavu, Thamphi tries to rape her. A witness rescues her. Thamphi then goes about saying that Ammini understands his feelings and everyone should accept their love. At first, Raghavan doesn't believe the story but eventually, his mother and relatives prevail upon him.

When Ammini realizes Thamphi has been lying, she goes to Raghavan's house. He avoids her and tells her never to see him again. Against his wishes, Raghavan's mother arranges his marriage to Murappennu Mallika. He is forced to marry. Afterwards, he beats his wife and abuses her verbally, forcing Mallika to go back to her parents. Ammini attempts suicide, but she is brought to elderly Dr Manuel whose saves her and asks her to marry him, but she doesn't accept because she still loves Raghavan.

Dr Manuel doesn't understand why she refused his proposal. Eventually, he marries her. After a few days, Raghavan sees Ammini in a hospital, finds out they are still in love and remember intimate moments from the past. Dr Manuel has lingering doubts about their relationship.

A few days later, Ammini finds out that she's pregnant. She knows that this is Raghavan's child and tells him. He tells her to trick Dr Manuel by saying it is his child. Ammini listens, but Dr Manuel knows that he is too old and cannot be the father. He says nothing about it. Ammini is afraid, and after nine months, she gives birth to a baby. Dr Manuel knows everything. Ammini realizes this and tries to confuse him by saying that this is his child. Dr Manuel states that his friend, Dr Ravi, told him that he could not be the child's father. Ammini's lies are exposed. After some time, she goes to Dr Manuel to apologize but finds him unconscious on the floor after he had consumed poison.

Raghavan's mother tells her son to patch up with Mallika as she truly loves him. Raghavan feels sorry and asks Mallika to forgive him. His mother sends him back to his new house.

Ammini, with the baby in hand, attempts suicide by lying on a railway track. Thamphi tries to stop her by saying that he loves Ammini more than anyone. He takes the baby. He steps backwards but when he turns around, Ammini is dead. He goes to Raghavan and hands him the baby, saying that Ammini is dead and that they must take care of the child. Raghavan refuses to look after the baby, but Thamphi explains he is this baby's father. Thamphi returns home.

Cast 
Prem Nazir as Ravi 
Sheela as Ammini
Sathyan as Dr. Issac Matthew
Jayabharathi as Mallika
Paul Vengola as Pilla 
Kaviyoor Ponnamma as Ravi's mother
Alummoodan as Vaidyar Antony
Kaduvakulam Antony as Puramboku
Meena as Amritham
N. Govindankutty as Keshavan Thampi
T. P. Radhamani as Nurse

Soundtrack
The music was composed by G. Devarajan and K. Raghavan and the lyrics were written by Vayalar Ramavarma and Changampuzha.

References

External links
 

1971 films
1970s Malayalam-language films